Wilma Salas Rosell (born 9 March 1991) is a Cuban female volleyball player. She was part of the Cuba women's national volleyball team. She currently plays in Hellenic Volley League for Olympiacos Piraeus.

She participated at the 2010 FIVB Volleyball Women's World Championship in Japan., when she used to play with Santiago de Cuba.

Career
Wilma Salas' career started at the age of 16 in Cuban championship, playing for the local team of Santiago de Cuba, where she remained until 2012. After two years of inactivity, she returned to the field in the 2014-15 season in Azerbaijan Super League, when she signed her first professional contract with Rabitə Baku, winning the championship. She also received the local sporting nationality, becoming also known as Wilma Aslihanova. In the following championship she moved to Turkey, where she defended the colors of Çanakkale, in Turkish League, also remaining there in the 2016-17 season, playing with the Halkbank Ankara shirt.

For the 2018-19 championship Wilma Salas played for Cuneo Volley, in the Italian League. Then she moved to Philippines for the end of the season, where she played in the local championship with the Petro Gazz Angels. The following season she moved to the Polish club of Chemik Police, winning one Super Cup, two Polish Cups and two league titles, although she did not play most of the 2020-21 season due to a serious knee injury, which occurred in the initial part of the championship.

In the 2021-22 season Salas returned to the field in Hellenic Volley League for Greek champions Olympiacos Piraeus.

International career
In 2008 Wilma Salas made her debut in the Cuban national team, with which a year later she became the protagonist of the 2010 world championship qualifiers, gaining access to the world championship and being awarded as the best attacker and best server of the tournament. Later that year she won the bronze medal at the 2009 North American Championship, and in 2011 she won the silver medal at the Pan American Games. In 2012 she wore the national team shirt for the last time, winning a bronze medal again, this time in the Pan-American Cup.

Sporting achievements

National Team
 2010  Montreux Volley Masters
 2011  Montreux Volley Masters
 2011  Pan American Games
 2012  Pan-American Cup

Clubs

Intenrational competitions
 2015  Women's CEV Cup, with Rabita Baku
 2016  BVA Cup with Çanakkale Belediyespor

National championships
 2009/2010  Cuban Championship, with Santiago de Cuba
 2010/2011  Cuban Championship, with Santiago de Cuba
 2014/2015  Azerbaijan Championship, with Rabita Baku
 2019/2020  Polish Championship, with Chemik Police
 2020/2021  Polish Championship, with Chemik Police

National trophies
 2019  Polish Super Cup, with Chemik Police
 2020  Polish Super Cup, with Chemik Police
 2019/2020  Polish Cup, with Chemik Police
 2020/2021   Polish Cup, with Chemik Police

Individual awards
 ''2019 Philippines - Premier Volleyball League Reinforced Conference "Best Foreign Player"

References

External links
 Profile - clubs - titles at women.volleybox.net 
 Profile at www.fivb.org
 Olympiacos team 2021-22 at cev.eu
 Wilma Salas in Olympiacos Piraeus at www.athina984.gr
 Sslas in CEV Champions League at cev.eu

1991 births
Living people
Cuban women's volleyball players
Olympiacos Women's Volleyball players
Place of birth missing (living people)
Volleyball players at the 2011 Pan American Games
Pan American Games silver medalists for Cuba
Pan American Games medalists in volleyball
Opposite hitters
Outside hitters
Medalists at the 2011 Pan American Games
21st-century Cuban women